Local elections in Caloocan were held on May 9, 2016, within the Philippine general election. The voters elected for the elective local posts in the city: the mayor, vice mayor, the two Congressmen, and the councilors, six in each of the city's two legislative districts.

Background

On October 7, 2015, incumbent city mayor Oscar Malapitan announced that he would run again for mayor of Caloocan under the "Tao Ang Una" (People First) party. Originally, Tao ang Una was Malapitan's campaign slogan during the 2013 elections, but he formed his own political party that was approved by the COMELEC on September 18. Malapitan represented and chaired the city's United Nationalist Alliance (UNA) chapter.

Tao Ang Una party was composed of city-based politicians affiliated with the Liberal Party (LP), Pwersa ng Masang Pilipino (PMP) and UNA. Among them was the LP Vice Chairman for Political Affairs and District 2 Representative Edgar Erice and Vice Mayor Luis Macario "Maca" Asistio.

Malapitan, sought re-election in the elections, up against the former city mayor and District 1 Representative Recom Echiverri, who ran under the Nationalist People's Coalition (NPC). Both Malapitan and Echiverri also faced Macario "Boy" Asistio Jr., who served as the city mayor of Caloocan for 14 years.

Candidates
Source:

Mayor

Vice Mayor

Representative, 1st District

Representative, 2nd District

Councilor

Team Oca

Team Recom

1st District

|-bgcolor=black
|colspan=5|

2nd District

|-bgcolor=black
|colspan=5|

References

External links
COMELEC's List of Local Candidates for Verification

2016 Philippine local elections
Elections in Caloocan
2016 elections in Metro Manila